Galen A. Johnson (born 1948) is a professor of philosophy at the University of Rhode Island and the General Secretary of the International Merleau-Ponty Circle.

Education and background
Johnson received his Ph.D. in Philosophy from Boston University in 1977. He has been teaching at the University of Rhode Island since 1976. His research interests include phenomenology, aesthetics, American philosophy, and recent French philosophy. He is the author of numerous articles in contemporary continental philosophy and has held fellowships from the National Endowment for the Humanities, the American Council for Learned Societies, and the American Philosophical Society. He has published four books that deal with aesthetics. Johnson convened over the URI Center for the Humanities from 1994-1996, and was Director of the Center from 2007-2013.

Publications
1989: Earth and Sky, History and Philosophy 
1990: Ontology and Alterity in Merleau-Ponty 
1993: The Merleau-Ponty Aesthetics Reader 
2010: The Retrieval of the Beautiful

Awards
1996: URI Teaching Excellence Award
URI Center for the Humanities Subvention grant, for his book The Retrieval of the Beautiful: Thinking Through Merleau-Ponty’s Aesthetics.
2009: URI Center for the Humanities Visiting Scholar grant, for the visit of Professor Duane Davis of the University of North Carolina-Asheville.
2014: URI Center for the Humanities Faculty Subvention grant, for his forthcoming book Merleau-Ponty’s Poets and Poetics.

References

External links
 Galen Johnson's faculty page

1948 births
20th-century American non-fiction writers
20th-century American philosophers
21st-century American non-fiction writers
21st-century American philosophers
American ethicists
American male non-fiction writers
American philosophy academics
Boston University College of Arts and Sciences alumni
Continental philosophers
Epistemologists
Lecturers
Living people
Metaphysicians
Ontologists
Phenomenologists
Philosophers of art
Philosophers of culture
Philosophers of education
Philosophers of literature
Philosophers of mind
Philosophy writers
Social philosophers
University of Rhode Island faculty
20th-century American male writers
21st-century American male writers